Ipso–Euroclean was a Belgian professional cycling team that existed from 1993 to 1999. It underwent several name changes, being known as Trident–Schick and the Asfra Racing Team before forming the Ipso team in 1996.

Major wins
 Circuit Franco-Belge: Dainis Ozols (1994)
 Scheldeprijs: Peter Van Petegem (1994)
 Tour de Vendée: Patrick Van Roosbroeck (1994)
 Tour de Berne: Andreas Kappes (1994)
 Internatie Reningelst: Arvis Piziks (1994)
 Schaal Sels: Daniel Verelst (1994)

References

Cycling teams based in Belgium
Defunct cycling teams based in Belgium
1993 establishments in Belgium
1999 disestablishments in Belgium
Cycling teams established in 1993
Cycling teams disestablished in 1999